Four Toes is a 2002 South Korean action-comedy film. The story involves four friends who become gangsters. As the film progresses they gain power and eventually find their way to Seoul.

Cast 
Heo Joon-ho - Audie
Lee Chang-hoon - Lecaf
Park Jun-gyu - Gak Granger
Lee Won-jong - Haetae
Kim Kap-soo - Bacchus
Ahn Suk-hwan
Ko Ku-ma
Jung Eun-pyo

References

See also 
 List of Korean-language films
 Korean cinema

2002 films
2000s Korean-language films
2002 action comedy films
Yakuza films
2002 comedy films
South Korean action comedy films
2000s Japanese films
2000s South Korean films